Saros cycle series 139 for lunar eclipses occurs at the moon's descending node, repeats every 18 years 11 and 1/3 days. It contains 79 events (75 before 3000 Dec 31 AD).

See also 
 List of lunar eclipses
 List of Saros series for lunar eclipses

Notes

External links 
 www.hermit.org: Saros 139

Lunar saros series